Two of the Few is a 1983 studio album by pianist Oscar Peterson and vibraphonist Milt Jackson.

Track listing 
 "Oh, Lady be Good!" (George Gershwin, Ira Gershwin) – 7:54
 "If I Had You" (Jimmy Campbell, Reginald Connelly, Ted Shapiro) – 4:27
 "Limehouse Blues" (Philip Braham, Douglas Furber) – 4:28
 "Mister Basie" (Peterson) – 5:54
 "Reunion Blues" (Jackson) – 5:12
 "More Than You Know" (Vincent Youmans, Billy Rose, Edward Eliscu) – 6:35
 "Just You, Just Me" (Jesse Greer, Raymond Klages) – 5:07
 "Here's Two of the Few" (Jackson) – 5:56

Personnel 
 Oscar Peterson – piano
 Milt Jackson – vibes

Production notes 
Norman Granz – producer
Bob Simpson – engineer

References 

1983 albums
Oscar Peterson albums
Milt Jackson albums
Albums produced by Norman Granz
Pablo Records albums